Only Yesterday: The Carpenters Story is an English documentary about American pop-duo the Carpenters that aired on BBC One on April 9, 2007 for the first time. Since then it has been replayed many times on BBC Four.

It features behind the scenes material, childhood pictures, interviews by Richard Carpenter, John Bettis, Herb Alpert and Jerry Moss (co-founders of A&M Records), and others. It was directed by Samantha Peters and contains rare footage of "For All We Know" on The Andy Williams Show (1971); the Dick Carpenter Trio with Karen on drums and lead singing in "Dancing in the Street" on Your All American College Show (1968); "Love Is Surrender" on the London Bridge Special featuring Tom Jones. It was produced in 16:9 widescreen.

External links 

Video on YouTube

References 
Citations

2007 television films
2007 films
The Carpenters
Documentary films about singers